SLAF Colombo is the Sri Lanka Air Force headquarters in Colombo. In this capacity it has the offices of the Commander of the Air Force, Chief of Staff, the Board of Management (BOM) and Board of Directors (BOD) of the Sri Lanka Air Force. All air and ground operations are directed from SLAF Colombo.

Apart from functioning as a headquarters, it is a limited air base for helicopter operations. Established soon after the formation of Royal Ceylon Air Forces was formed in 1951 at the former officers mess of the former Ceylon Rifle Regiment at Rifle green. The officer's mess was moved in the 1970s when the Trans Asia Hotel was made in its location. The mess is currently housed in the Cinnamon gardens area of Colombo. It is the only Officers' Mess to be located outside a SLAF Station premises.

External links
Sailing SLAF Colombo
CofN participates in Oath Taking Ceremony at SLNS Parakrama on 2006_01_01

Sri Lanka Air Force bases
Government buildings in Colombo